Biak ( or 'Biak language';  or 'our language';),  also known as Biak-Numfor, Noefoor, Mafoor, Mefoor, Nufoor, Mafoorsch, Myfoorsch and Noefoorsch, is an Austronesian language of the South Halmahera-West New Guinea subgroup of the Eastern Malayo-Polynesian languages.

According to Ethnologue, it is spoken by about 70,000 people in Biak and Numfor and numerous small islands in the Schouten Islands, located in Papua province of Western New Guinea, northeastern Indonesia.

Dialects
There are a number of different dialects of Biak spoken on various different islands, the most well-known being Biak-Numfoor, spoken on the island of Numfoor. These dialect differences are minor and mostly limited to slight regular sound changes. The vast majority of Biak speakers are also fluent in the local variety of Malay, but not all of them are proficient in standard Indonesian.

Geographical distributions of Biak dialects within Raja Ampat Regency (Ronsumbre 2020):

Betew dialect
Waigeo Selatan District: Saonek, Saporkren, Yenbeser, Yenwaupur, Sawinggrai, Kapisawar, and Arborek villages.
Waigeo Barat District: Mutus, Biantsyi, Waisilip, Manyaifun, Meos Manggara, and Pam villages.
Kofiau District: Deer, Balal, and Tolobi villages.
Misool District: Pulau Tikus, Solol, Meos Kapal, and Umkabu villages.
Samate District: Jefman village. Teluk Manyalibit District: Mumes village.

Kafdaron dialect
Samate District: Yensawai, Amdui, Yenanas, and Aresi villages

Karon dialect
Sausapor District (in Sausapor village) and Biak Karo District, Tambrauw Regency

Usba dialect
Waigeo Utara District: Rauki village. Ayau District: Dorekar and Meosbekwan villages.

Wardo dialect
Waigeo Timur District: Yensner, Urbinasopen, Yembekaki, and Puper villages.
Waigeo Utara District: Menir, Warwanai, Boni, Asukweri, and Kabare villages.
Ayau District: Rutung, Reni, and Yenkawir villages.

Sociolinguistic situation
Despite the comparatively high number of speakers compared to some other Austronesian languages, Biak is still in danger of extinction. Within the main towns, the generation of speakers aged between 20 and 50 have only passive knowledge of the language and rarely use the language actively, instead preferring to use Malay. Younger generations do not even generally have passive knowledge of the language. Biak is only actively used as a spoken language by members of the community over 50 years of age or so and even they regularly code switch into Malay. However, within the villages further from town there are still children who are fluent in Biak. Songs in Biak are also very popular throughout the islands.

There is a strong initiative to promote the use of the Biak language, with translations of various books and teaching manuals as well as a radio station and a number of church services throughout the year being conducted solely in Biak. Since 2002, there has also been an initiative to introduce Biak being taught formerly in schools on the islands.

Phonology
Biak has a phoneme inventory consisting of 13 consonants and 5 vowels, in which vowel length is phonemic. In the orthography long vowels are written with an acute accent.

The vowel  is the only rounded vowel in Biak; the other four are unrounded.

Morphology

Pronouns and person markers
In Biak pronouns and articles are morphologically related, with both situating a given participant by indicating their relative discourse or spatial (e.g. directional or motional) status. This is not uncommon for Austronesian Languages. Pronouns in Biak are marked for number and clusivity.

Free personal pronouns in Biak share their main distributional properties with nouns; however, they are somewhat more restricted. They can be used as a complement of a predicate or preposition but they cannot be used as subjects. In the example below, the use of the first-person personal pronoun  can be seen to complement a verb, while the second example shows how a free personal pronoun, in this clause third-person , cannot be used as a subject:

Pronominal affixes
In Biak, pronominal affixes can combine with verbs in three possible inflection patterns (given in the table below), which are partly phonologically conditioned. 

Due to the person marking nature of these affixes, the need for the presence of a core noun phrase in the same clause is negated. Thus the following sentence is still grammatical without NP Rusa nanine, as the verb has a pronominal affix that gives the same information.

These pronominal markers are person markers and are found in the final position of the noun phrase they determine. They attach to verbs along with a specifier that attaches after the pronominal affix; due to their distribution properties these markers should be considered clitics.

This is shown in the examples below:

 Non-specific

 Specific

Demonstratives 
Biak has identical forms in adnominal and pronominal demonstratives, which is common in Austronesian languages. In Biak, demonstratives can be used as part of complex articles containing demonstrative roots and also motion markers and directionals. Complex articles, however, do not have both a directional and a motion marker.

Also, it is important to note that the corpus contains no example of complex articles containing both a directional and a motion marker.

In Biak, the relationship between the third-person pronouns and demonstratives are unrelated to demonstratives, which is uncommon in Austronesian languages. However, Biak follows the worldwide trend in terms of the relationship.

Moreover, depending on the speaker's relative distance, Biak has three-way distance contrasts of adnominal demonstratives, which is common in Austronesian languages. The comparison is restricted to only adnominal use because some languages do not express the same distance contrasts in adnominal and pronominal demonstratives.

If a complex article contains a demonstrative, the demonstrative is preceded by person-SPC, as illustrated by  '3SG.SPC-this' and  '3SG.SPC-over.there,' respectively. Also, in the below examples, situational use of demonstratives is shown.

The paradigm for complex articles sets the basis for deictic nouns, predicative pronouns, and locative-existentials.

Deictic nouns 
Deictic nouns are formed by applying the formative  'place' at the position preceding demonstratives, as illustrated by  'place-back-over.there' and  'place-here.'

The situational use of demonstratives is seen in (9). On the other hand, (10) shows  'this' as the situational use of demonstratives and  'here' as the anaphoric use of demonstratives.

Predicative pronouns 
Predicative pronouns are formed by using the inflected predicative is 'PRED' at the position otherwise occupied by the marker of givenness an. This is illustrated by  '3SG.PRED-SPC-this' in both (11) and (12).

In (11), it depends on the context whether situational or anaphoric use of the demonstrative is. Situational use of the demonstrative is given in (12).

Locative-existentials 
Locative-existentials is different from predicative pronouns because they do not possess a specificity marker, which is illustrated by  '3SG.PRED-over.there'.

In (13), the use of the demonstrative depends on the context.

Semantics

Demonstratives 

For the semantic characterization of demonstratives, a part of Levinson's terminology should be known to grasp the difference between the Figure and the Ground or the Relatum. The Figure refers to an entity positioned somewhere in Space, while the Ground or the Relatum designate the entity in terms of where the entity is.    

As additional information, there are three essential points about Levinson's terminology. First, the 'frame of reference' can be classified as an intrinsic frame of reference, a relative frame of reference, and an absolute frame of reference. Second, it is crucial to grasp the origo of the coordinate system. The deictic centre called origo is approximately equal to the speaker's position. Third, it is vital to comprehend deixis. For spatial deixis, the interpretation of spatial linguistics elements is defined by the location of extra-linguistic entities.

Regarding the demonstratives usage, it may be followed by pointing, such as lip-pointing, head pointing, or finger pointing.

Syntax

Demonstratives 
From a perspective of syntax, Deictic nouns typically set the complement of a preposition. This is clear from the form  'place-here,'  'place-over.there' in (14) and (15), respectively. However, the demonstrative locational nouns are used on their own, without a preceding preposition.  This is illustrated by  'place-here' in (16).

In (14), (15), and (16), these contain the situational use of demonstratives.

Possession 
Similar to other Austronesian languages, Biak makes a grammatical distinction between alienable and inalienable for possession.

Alienable possession 
In alienable possession, a possessive pronominal is formed with the possessive marker  to signify the person, number and gender of the possessor, and is followed by a pronominal article marking the gender and number of the possessed. The following table illustrates the possessive pronominal construction.

Typically, Biak follows a possessor-possessum structure for alienable possessive construction, with the possessive pronominal in the adnominal position:

However, alienable possession can also be formed in the order of possessum-possessor, though this is much less frequent:

Inalienable possession 
Inalienable possessive construction differs from alienable in that there is no system of pronominal possessives, only a set of affixes located on the possessum. In contrast to alienable possession, inalienable possession can only take the order of possessor-possessum. Biak contains three subsets of inalienability: body parts, Kinship, and locational.

Body parts 
Not all body parts are considered inalienable. Those that are form the stem words from which to derive other body parts through the method of compounding. For example, the alienable 'knee' is formed through the inalienable stem  ('leg') and the compounding  ('back') to form . Possessive construction for alienable body parts follows the same pattern as other alienable terms. The inflectional system for inalienable body parts is as follows:

Unusual for Austronesian languages of the area, Biak contains a partial prefix system for inflecting inalienable body parts. For the plural forms, suffix  reflects plurality and animateness of possessor and suffix  expresses plurality and inaninameteness of the possessum. As stated above, inalienable possession is formed via a possessor-possessum structure:

Kinship terms 
Similarly to body parts, not all kinship terms are inalienable. The alienable kinship terms are formed through the same compounding method as alienable body parts, and follow the same possessive construction rules as other alienable terms. This table illustrates the inflectional system for inalienable kinship words:

All nouns that follow the table's procedure have an
idiosyncratic form for the first person, using a shorter term for the second and third person. (REF pg. 244) Here is an example of the usage of inalienable kinship inflection:

Locational nouns 
Locational nouns are the last distinction of inalienability found in Biak. Locational nouns refer to locations that are ‘inherently connected to an entity’. For example, a tree in Biak is referred to as having an 'upper part' and a 'lower part', and a canoe a 'front', a 'middle' and a 'back'. The following table exhibits the inflectional system for inalienable locational nouns:

The suffix  expresses the plurality and inanimateness of
the possessum (REF pg. 250). The locational noun possessive structure is illustrated in this example:

Negation 
Biak distinguishes between factual and imperative negation (prohibitive).

Factual negation: 
The negator  occurs clause-finally in intransitive and transitive clauses.

Intransitive

Transitive

In clauses with non-core arguments,  follows directly the argument it negates.

 is also used to negate nominal clauses.

Factual negation in complex clauses 

In the corpus of spontaneous speech collected by van den Heuvel, there are no examples with  appearing at the end of the first clause.

In other complex clauses the negator may follow the first or final clause.

With  
 is a loan from Malay/Indonesian.

Imperative negation: 
The prohibitive marker  is used to negate arguments in 1st, 2nd and 3rd person.

 1st person

 2nd person

 3rd person

Other negators 
To express 'not yet', Biak uses the marker . For 'not any more'  is used.

Typological perspectives 
In Austronesian languages, the negator commonly precedes the predicate. Thus Biak, with clause final negation, is atypical in this feature. Clause final negation, however, is a common feature in the region of the Eastern Bird's Head Peninsula, in both Austronesian and Papuan languages. It appears to be of Papuan origin.

Numerals

Glossary 

SPC:specific
NSPC:nonspecific
NSG:non-singular
GIV:given
SIM:simultaneous

Footnotes

References

External links

 University of Oxford On-line language Documentation
 Open Language Archive Resources
 website on Biak language with texts and recordings

South Halmahera–West New Guinea languages
Languages of western New Guinea
Biak
Schouten Islands
Papua (province) culture
Endangered Austronesian languages